The following is a list of episodes of the Korean variety show You Quiz on the Block.
Names of the guests are in revised romanization unless the English spellings are known.

Season 1

2018

Season 2

2019

Season 3

2020
The episodes were filmed while complying with the COVID-19 prevention measures prescribed by the Korea Disease Control and Prevention Agency such as checking temperature, wearing face masks, using hand sanitizer, and keeping list of entrants.

2021
The episodes were filmed while complying with the COVID-19 prevention measures prescribed by the Korea Disease Control and Prevention Agency such as checking temperature, wearing face masks, using hand sanitizer, and keeping list of entrants.

2022

Season 4

2022

2023

Notes

References

Lists of variety television series episodes
You Quiz on the Block